Dewey Defeats Truman is an American indie rock band, formed in San Diego, California in the late 1990s. From their founding in 1998 until late 2003, the band quickly made a name for itself in the California indie rock scene, sharing the stage with bands like The Jesus Lizard, Jimmy Eat World, Archers of Loaf, and Kelley Deal, and performing at such festivals as NXNW in Portland, SXSW in Austin, CMJ Music Marathon in New York City. The band continued to play together until late 2003, when they went on an extended hiatus, before reforming in 2018.

History
In 1998, members of other local bands, namely Red Dye No. 5 and Luper joined to form Dewey Defeats Truman. James Reader and Scott Frazier (originally from Red Dye No. 5, as the band's bassist/vocalist and drummer respectively) joined Mark MacBride (originally from Luper as the bands guitarist and vocalist) at the San Diego rock club The Casbah, where they began to write songs together.

The band quickly found success, touring various festivals, including NXNW in Portland, SXSW in Austin, CMJ Music Marathon in New York City, and opening for acts including Jimmy Eat World and Archers of Loaf, and continued to play across the country until late 2003 when they went on hiatus. 

In mid 2018, bassist James Reader was approached by a DJ from local alternative radio station 91X, who asked the band to reform for a series of 30-year anniversary shows the station was running throughout the year. The band agreed and reformed to play the show. Among the success of the comeback show, the band's original label Silver Girl Records re-released the song Blue Ruin with the previously unreleased track Reverse Status, as a 7" single. The bands success quickly resumed, and in the following year they were added to another show celebrating 30 years of the existence of The Casbah, where the band had gotten its start.

The success of their live shows has continued, and Dewey Defeats Truman continues to play sporadic live shows today. Recent shows have included a return to The Casbah, where they opened for June of 44.

Discography
The band's original label Silver Girl Records re-released the song Blue Ruin with the previously unreleased track Reverse Status, as a 7" single. In 2021, the band self-released their first new material in almost 20 years, a self-recorded 2 song digital single titled "Always Waiting in the Wrong Line" to Bandcamp. Later that same year, Dewey Defeats Truman re-entered Doubletime Studios with their original engineer Jeff Forrest and recorded a 5-song E.P. Silver Girl Records released the results of that recording session, "The Way You Shatter", digitally. The release promptly earned the band a nomination for Best Rock Album at the 31st annual San Diego Music Awards. In 2022, Silver Girl released the EP on limited edition clear vinyl and Compact Disc.
{| class="wikitable"
|+Discography 2001–present
!Title
!Year
!Label
!Type
|-
|B-Sides, Rarities, and Out-Takes                                        
|2001              
|Silver Girl Records
|CD, Digital
|-
|The Road to Nowhere Maps 
|2002
|Has Anyone Ever Told You? Records|CD, Digital
|-
|Blue Ruin b/w Reverse Status 7"
|2018
|Silver Girl Records
|Single
|-
|Always Waiting in the Wrong Line 
|2021
|Self Release/Band Camp
|Digital single
|-
|The Way You Shatter|2022
|Silver Girl Records
|12" vinyl, CD, Digital
|}

 Music videos 
To date, the band has released two music videos. The first, titled "Slow Reaction" was released to all platforms in October 2021 to promote The Way You Shatter E.P., and a follow up in May 2022 titled Shots Taken''.

References

External links
 
 

Musical groups from San Diego
Musical groups established in the 1990s